Michael Gordon was a British film editor and screenwriter. He also directed a couple of documentaries and the 1951 feature film Wherever She Goes.

Selected filmography
 Sleeping Car (1933)
 Me and Marlborough (1935)
 The First Offence (1936)
 Seven Sinners (1936)
 His Lordship (1936)
 King Solomon's Mines (1937)
 Strange Boarders (1938)
 Climbing High (1938)
 The Sky's the Limit (1938)
 Esther Waters (1948)
 All Over the Town (1949)
 Wherever She Goes (1951)
 Malta Story (1953)
 Simba (1955)
 Safari (1956)
 The Rising of the Moon (1957)
 Night of the Demon (1957)

References

Bibliography 
 Chris Fujiwara. Jacques Tourneur: The Cinema of Nightfall. McFarland, 1998.

External links 
 

1909 births
2008 deaths
British film editors
British film directors
Mass media people from Bradford
20th-century British screenwriters
Film people from Yorkshire